St. Peter's Abbey may refer to:
Abbey of Saint Peters (Assisi), Italy
St. Peter's Abbey on the Madron, former abbey at Flintsbach am Inn, Bavaria, Germany
St. Peter's Abbey in the Black Forest, former abbey at St. Peter im Schwarzwald, Baden-Württemberg, Germany
St. Peter's Archabbey, Salzburg, Austria
St. Peter's Abbey, Saskatchewan, Canada
St. Peter's Abbey, Ghent, Belgium

See also
St. Peter's (disambiguation)